Scott Higgins (born 9 June 1976) is an Australian former footballer who played as a goalkeeper. His career saw him play in three different continents, Australia, Europe, and the Middle East.

Football career

Club career
He started his professional footballing career in the NSL with Canberra Cosmos and later returning to Queensland with Brisbane Strikers.

In the relaunched A-League, he secured a deal with Queensland Roar in 2005, before moving to Europe in June 2006 to join Scottish Premier League club Falkirk. A difference of opinion with Falkirk boss John Hughes ended his stay in Scotland with the "Bairns" in a good position at sixth in the SPL and through to the semi finals of the League Cup. Before departing Scotland Higgins stated it was a boyhood dream to play against his much loved Glasgow Celtic at Parkhead on 23 December 2006. Higgins played a key role at keeping Celtic at bay and was a standout for the Bairns, saying after the game "no one can take that away from me, I loved every minute of it and knowing my family was here and my best mate Barry who is a mad hoops fan was sitting watching back in Australia makes me very proud"; however, they eventually went down one–nil. He departed Scotland on 24 January 2007 to join Israeli side Maccabi Herzliya.

Herzliya
When Higgins joined Herzliya, he became the first Australian in Israeli football. With some stellar performances he led his club to the Toto Cup final, a first ever for the club, where they defeated Hapoel Kfar Saba 2–1 at the Ramat Gan Stadium in Ramat Gan.

Unfortunately, despite helping Herzliya to lift the Toto Cup and avoid relegation from the Israeli Premier League, Higgins left the club in late May 2007 as the club moved to secure the Macedonian national team keeper, Jane Nikolovski, as a replacement in a deal that ultimately fell through.

A-League
On returning to Australia, he was signed by Adelaide United on a short-term contract as cover for injured goalkeeper Daniel Beltrame for the start of the 2007–08 season.

In December 2008, Higgins signed a four-game contract with the Wellington Phoenix as cover for Mark Paston. He has not yet made an appearance for the Phoenix. He was released halfway through his contract, as Paston became match-fit earlier than expected. He never got any game time with the Phoenix.

Miron Bleiberg, football director of new A-League club Gold Coast United has announced that Higgins will be signed by the club for the 2009–10 season. On 30 September 2008, he was announced along with goalkeeper Jess Vanstrattan as Gold Coast United's inaugural signings.

Coaching
At the conclusion of the 2010–11 A-League season Higgins retired and joined the staff at GCU as goalkeeping coach.

Politics
Higgins was an unsuccessful candidate for the 2013 federal election in the Australian Senate representing Queensland for the Palmer United Party.

References

External links
 Gold Coast United profile
 Oz Football profile

1976 births
Living people
Sportspeople from Cairns
Soccer players from Queensland
Association football goalkeepers
Australian soccer players
Australian expatriate soccer players
Expatriate footballers in Israel
Expatriate footballers in Scotland
A-League Men players
National Soccer League (Australia) players
Scottish Premier League players
Israeli Premier League players
Brisbane Strikers FC players
Falkirk F.C. players
Gold Coast United FC players
Maccabi Herzliya F.C. players
Brisbane Roar FC players
Expatriate association footballers in New Zealand
Wellington Phoenix FC players
United Australia Party (2013) politicians